Simon Dominic Rodhouse (20 April 1955 – 24 February 1983) was an English male athlete.

Athletics career
Rodhouse was a National champion after winning the 1981 UK Athletics Championships in the shot put.

He represented England in the shot put, at the 1982 Commonwealth Games in Brisbane, Queensland, Australia.

He was a PE and French teacher at St Mary's College in Southampton and was killed in a car crash (driving his V8 MGB GT) when returning home from an indoor athletics meeting at RAF Cosford on 24 February 1983.

References

1955 births
1983 deaths
Athletes (track and field) at the 1982 Commonwealth Games
Road incident deaths in England
English male shot putters
Commonwealth Games competitors for England